Roxanne Pierce (born October 14, 1954) is an American gymnast. She competed in six events at the 1972 Summer Olympics.

Competitive history

References

External links
 

1954 births
Living people
American female artistic gymnasts
Olympic gymnasts of the United States
Gymnasts at the 1972 Summer Olympics
Gymnasts from New Jersey
Pan American Games medalists in gymnastics
Pan American Games gold medalists for the United States
Pan American Games silver medalists for the United States
Pan American Games bronze medalists for the United States
Gymnasts at the 1971 Pan American Games
Gymnasts at the 1975 Pan American Games
Medalists at the 1975 Pan American Games
21st-century American women
20th-century American women